The Access road to Zhukovsky from M5 highway (also known as the Access road from M5 highway to LII) is a road running across a distance of 9 km from settlement Imeni Telmana to the Zhukovsky.

Route

Moscow region
 Imeni Telmana  
 Kulakovo
  Bridge across Moskva river (≈450 m) in Vill. Kulakovo
 Zhukovsky
  Bridge across Bykovka (≈70 m) in city Zhukovsky
   Ramenskoye
  Route end

Roads in Russia